The Deutsches Museum Bonn is a museum with exhibits and experiments of famous scientists, engineers and inventors. Its central themes are research and technology in Germany after 1945.

It is part of the Deutsches Museum in Munich. It was founded in 1995 at the instigation of the Association of Sponsors for the Promotion of German Science (Stifterverband für die Deutsche Wissenschaft) in the Science Centre (Wissenschaftszentrum) in Bonn.

Museum director has been Andrea Niehaus since 2001.

References

External links 

  

Museums in Bonn
Technology museums in Germany
Science museums in Germany
Museums established in 1995